Shopping is the act of visiting retailers to examine and purchase goods.

Shopping may also refer to:

Film
 Shopping (1994 film), a British film by Paul W. S. Anderson
 Shopping (2013 film), a New Zealand film by Mark Albiston and Louis Sutherland

Music
 Shopping (band), a British post-punk trio

Albums
 Shopping (Fann Wong album) or the title song, 1998
 Shopping (Inoue Yōsui and Okuda Tamio album) or the title song, 1997

Songs
 "Shopping" (Ryan Bang song), 2015
 "Shopping", by Barenaked Ladies from Everything to Everyone, 2003
 "Shopping", by the Jam, the B-side of "Beat Surrender", 1982
 "Shopping", by Pet Shop Boys from Actually, 1987
 "Shopping", by Saloon
 "Shopping", by Shonen Knife from Overdrive, 2014

Other uses
 Shopping (Luleå), a shopping mall in Luleå, Sweden
 Shopping (novel), a 1998 novel by Gavin Kramer

See also